SM U-43 was one of 329 submarines serving in the Imperial German Navy in World War I. She engaged in commerce warfare in the First Battle of the Atlantic, performing 11 patrols from 1915–1918.

U-43 was surrendered to the Allies at Harwich on 20 November 1918 in accordance with the requirements of the Armistice with Germany. She was sold (without engines, removed at Chatham) by the British Admiralty to George Cohen on 3 March 1919 for £2,400, and was broken up at Swansea from May 1919 and 1922.

Summary of raiding history

References

Notes

Citations

Bibliography

External links

World War I submarines of Germany
Ships built in Danzig
1914 ships
U-boats commissioned in 1915
Type U 43 submarines